The Caversham International Tennis Tournament was a professional tennis tournament played on carpet. It was a part of the ATP Challenger Tour. It was held in Jersey, Channel Islands, from 2008 to 2009.

Past finals

Singles

Doubles

External links
Tennis in Jersey
ITF search

ATP Challenger Tour
Carpet court tennis tournaments
Tennis tournaments in the United Kingdom
Recurring sporting events established in 2008
Recurring sporting events disestablished in 2009